Michael Hudson (born March 14, 1939) is an American economist, Professor of Economics at the University of Missouri–Kansas City and a researcher at the Levy Economics Institute at Bard College, former Wall Street analyst, political consultant, commentator and journalist. He is a contributor to The Hudson Report, a weekly economic and financial news podcast produced by Left Out.

Hudson graduated from the University of Chicago (BA, 1959) and New York University (MA, 1965, PhD, 1968) and worked as a balance of payments economist in Chase Manhattan Bank (1964–68). He was assistant professor of economics at the New School for Social Research (1969–72) and worked for various governmental and non-governmental organizations as an economic consultant (1980s–1990s).

Hudson has devoted his career to the study of debt, both domestic debt (loans, mortgages, interest payments), and external debt. In his works, he consistently advocates the idea that loans and exponentially growing debts that outstrip profits from the real economy are disastrous for both the government and the people of the borrowing state as they wash money (payments to usurers and rentiers) from turnover, not leaving them funds to buy goods and services, thus leading to debt deflation. Hudson notes that the existing economic theory, the Chicago School in particular, serves rentiers and financiers and has developed a special language designed to reinforce the impression that there is no alternative to the status quo. In a false theory, the parasitic encumbrances of a real economy, instead of being deducted in accounting, add up as an addition to the gross domestic product and are presented as productive. Hudson sees consumer protection, state support of infrastructure projects, and taxation of rentier sectors of the economy rather than workers, as a continuation of the line of classical economists today.

He has been noted for having predicted the Great Recession of 2007-08 before it happened, in an April 2006 article in Harper's,  citing correctly its cause and timeframe.

Biography

Early life and education 
Hudson was born on March 14, 1939, in Chicago, Illinois. Hudson is a fifth-generation American as on his maternal line he has Ojibwe blood. His father, Nathaniel Carlos Hudson (1908–2003), received an MBA from the  University of Minnesota in 1929, the year the Great Depression struck. His father joined the trade union struggle, became an active Trotskyist trade unionist, editor of the Northwest Organizer and The Industrial Organizer, and wrote articles for other trade union publications. When Hudson was three years old, his father was arrested on Smith Act violation grounds, an act aimed at suppressing Trotskyists in the United States.

Hudson received his primary and secondary education in a private school at the University of Chicago Laboratory Schools. After his graduation, he entered the University of Chicago with two majors: Germanic philology and history. In 1959, Hudson graduated from the University of Chicago with a bachelor's degree. After graduation, he worked as an assistant to Jeremy Kaplan at the Free Press in Chicago. He managed to obtain the rights to the English language editions of the works of György Lukács as well as the rights to the archives and works of Leon Trotsky after the death of Trotsky's widow, Natalia Sedova.

Hudson found work at the publishing house neither interesting nor profitable. Hudson, who had studied music from his childhood, moved to New York in 1960 in hopes of becoming a pupil of the conductor Dimitris Mitropoulos, but these plans were not to be realized.

Studying the economy and working for banks 
In 1961, Hudson enrolled in the Economics Department of New York University. His master's thesis was devoted to the development philosophy of the World Bank and special attention was paid to credit policy in the agricultural sector. Many years later, Hudson recognized: "The topics that most interested me ... were not taught at New York University where I took my graduate economics degrees. In fact, they are not taught in any university departments: the dynamics of debt, and how the pattern of bank lending inflates land prices, or national income accounting and the rising share absorbed by rent extraction in the Finance, Insurance and Real Estate (FIRE) sector. There was only one way to learn how to analyze these topics: to work for banks."

In 1964, Hudson, who had just received his master's degree in economics, joined Chase Manhattan Bank's economics research department as a balance of payments specialist. His task was to identify the payment capacity of Argentina, Brazil, and Chile. Based on export earnings and other international payment data, Hudson had to determine the income the bank could derive from the debt that these countries had accumulated. He recalled that, "I soon found that the Latin American countries I analyzed were fully 'loaned up'. There were no more hard currency inflows available to extract as interest on new loans or bond issues. In fact, there was capital flight." Among other tasks that Hudson performed at Chase Manhattan was an analysis of the balance of payments of the US oil industry and the tracking of "dirty" money that ended up in Swiss banks. According to Hudson, this work gave him invaluable experience in understanding how banks and the financial sector work as well as understanding how bank accounting and real life correlate.

Hudson left his job at the bank to complete his doctoral dissertation. His thesis was devoted to US economic and technological thought in the 19th century. It was successfully defended in 1968 and in 1975 it was published under the title Economics and Technology in 19th Century American Thought: The Neglected American Economists.

In 1968, Hudson joined the accounting firm Arthur Andersen, for whom he expanded his analysis of payment flows for all areas of US production. He discovered that the United States deficit was evident only in the military sphere: "My charts revealed that the U.S. payments deficit was entirely military in character throughout the 1960s. The private sector—foreign trade and investment—was exactly in balance, year after year, and "foreign aid" actually produced a dollar surplus (as it was required to do under U.S. law)." However, the accounting system used in the US after the war mixed the balance of individuals and state payments flow into a single balance which concealed the budget deficit. Hudson proposed dividing US balance of payments figures into governmental and private sectors.

Career 
In 1972, Hudson moved to the Hudson Institute headed by Herman Kahn. In 1979, he became an advisor to the United Nations Institute for Training and Research (UNITAR).

In 1984, Hudson joined Harvard's archaeology faculty at the Peabody Museum as a research fellow in Babylonian economics. A decade later, he was a founding member of the International Scholars Conference on Ancient Near Eastern Economies, an international group of Assyriologists and archaeologists who analyzed the economic origins of civilization.
 
In the mid-1990s, Hudson became a professor of economics at the University of Missouri–Kansas City and a fellow at the Levy Economics Institute at Bard College. , Hudson was the director of the Institute for the Study of Long-Term economic Trends (ISLET) and the Distinguished Research Professor of Economics at the University of Missouri–Kansas City.

He has been noted for having predicted the Great Recession of 2007-08 before it happened, in an April 2006 article in Harper's,  citing correctly its cause and timeframe..

Contributions 
Hudson devoted his first works to the problem of the gold and foreign exchange reserves and the US foreign economic debt, a subject his mentor Terence McCarthy had previously dealt with in detail. 
In his first article titled "Sieve of Gold", Hudson analyzed the negative economic consequences of the Vietnam War. He drew attention to the fact, even without war, the US economy very soon came to a critical point. The welfare of the US in the postwar years was in many cases provided with a "golden pillow", it had created for itself between the end of WW I and the end of WW II (per Michael's Empire lectures on Youtube April 2021 and other 2021 recorded lectures). 
Since 1934, when frightened by Adolf Hitler, Europeans began to buy US government securities, thereby shifting their gold and foreign exchange reserves to US banks. 
From 1934, US gold and foreign exchange reserves increased from $7.4 billion to $20.1 billion in 1945. 
After the creation of the Bretton Woods system, an International Monetary Fund (IMF) was created within the framework as well as a gold pool which guaranteed the dollar was as good as gold, capital began to leave the country and move to Europe. 
Military expenditures accounted for a huge share of the United States budget deficit, which tried in vain to prevent further growth in the deficit, on the one hand in every way limiting the flow of gold and on the other hand not allowing foreign central banks to receive gold for the given dollars. Such a policy appealed to European bankers who found such a policy hypocritical.  Yet they went along with it, acquiesced, surrendered, as they were afraid to bring down the dollar and thereby deprive their products of competitiveness in US markets.

In A Financial Payments-Flow Analysis of U.S. International Transactions, 1960-1968, Hudson showed US export statistics erroneously included a class of goods whose transfer abroad did not involve payment at any time, from residents of one nation to those of another; and, which are for this reason not really international transactions at all. Primary among this class of goods were the transfers of aircraft parts and components by the United States to international airlines at their overseas air terminals and installation on their aircraft.

These transfers were brought into the host country under bond and therefore were excluded from import statistics. At the same time, their value was included in the United States export statistics as a credit, therefore the government sector has been in sizable deficit on a payments-flow basis during 1960–1968, resulting mainly from its military operations. 
Existing accounting systems mixing government and private flows did not show the problem and the source of disparities. In his monograph, Hudson made an attempt to divide the United States balance of payments into government and private sectors.

In 1972, Hudson published Super Imperialism, which traced the history of the formation of American imperialism after the end of World War I. In Hudson's interpretation, super-imperialism is a stage of imperialism in which the state does not realize the interests of any group other than itself.  It is itself wholly and entirely aimed at colonializing other states, making them into client states by dollar diplomacy. Continuing the position outlined in A Financial Payments-Flow Analysis of U.S. International Transactions, 1960-1968, Hudson stressed the aid systems, World Bank and IMF formed after the end of World War II. All American foreign politics (including tied aid and debts) were aimed at restraining the self-sufficient economic development of Third World countries in economic sectors where the United States was afraid of emerging competition. At the same time, the US imposed so-called free trade policies on developing countries, policy which was the reverse of the one the US used itself to gain prosperity.

In 1971, after cancelling the right to redeem gold for dollars, the US forced foreign central banks to buy US treasury bonds.  This income was used to finance the federal deficit and large, overseas military expenditures. In exchange for providing a net surplus of assets, commodities, debt financing, goods and services, foreign countries were forced to hold an equal amount of US treasuries. This drove down US interest rates, which drove down the dollar's foreign exchange rate, making US goods more competitive overseas.

Hudson views foreign central banks buying treasuries as a legitimate effort to stabilize exchange rates rather than a currency manipulation. Foreign central banks could sell the excess dollars on the exchange market which would strengthen their currency.  Yet he calls this a dilemma as it decreases their ability to continue a trade surplus even though it also increases their purchasing power.

He believes keyboard credit and treasury outflows in exchange for foreign assets without a future, means for the United States to repay the treasuries and a decreasing value of the dollar is akin to military conquest. He believes the surplus balance of payments countries have [includes?] the right to stabilize exchange rates and expect repayment of the resulting loans even as industry shifts from the United States to creditor nations.

He states the Washington Consensus has encouraged the International Monetary Fund and World Bank to impose austerity so the United States itself is not exposed to, thanks to dollar dominance.  Dollar Diplomacy leads to subjecting other countries to unfair trade and investment intending to strip foreign assets and natural resources.  This includes privatizing infrastructure, preferably buying it at distressed prices.  Parasitic finance techniques (including Western-style tax breaks) are used to extract the maximum amount of the country's surplus and cripple it as an economic competitor to the US, rather than providing fairness and promoting each nation's self-sufficiency.

Debt in the ancient Near East 
At the end of the 1980s, Hudson diverged from the field of modern economics in order to explore the foundations of modern western financial practices and concepts in ancient Mesopotamia.  
Under the aegis of the Institute for the Study of Long-Term Economic Trends, which he organized, Hudson convened a series of five conferences between 1994 and 2004 gathering leading scholars in the pertinent disciplines to investigate this topic, assemble relevant contemporary scholarship and publish it in a series of volumes.  The five conferences focused on Privatization In The Ancient Near East and Classical World; Urbanization and Land Ownership; Debt and Economic Renewal in the Ancient Near East; Creating Economic Order:  Record-Keeping, Standardization, and the Development of Accounting; and Labor In The Ancient World.  
Cumulatively, this work demolishes a wide range of economic myths (the origin of markets and money in barter, for example, and of money in metals or coinage) and replaced them with carefully documented, extremely revealing facts. 
In their investigation of the origins of debt and usury they found the first and by far the earliest major creditors were the temples and palaces of Bronze Age Mesopotamia, not private individuals acting on their own. The rate of interest in each region was not based on productivity.  It was set purely for simplicity of calculation in the local system of fractional arithmetic, i.e., 1/60th per month in Mesopotamia and later one-tenth per year for Greece and 1/12th for Rome.  Money originated in book-keeping, not metals or barter or coinage.  Ideas about land ownership, mortgages, rents, and wages originated in this context and were determined by it.

The natural stability of a national state depends on having as many free, independent workers doing productive things.  The rise of personal debt, past a certain low threshold, begins to reduce worker productivity—even if it makes the elite financial class wealthier.   The proclamations of Jubilees or Clean Slates had the purpose of making workers more productive—and happier—thereby improving the economy. 
Hudson stated: "In the early 1990s I tried to write my own summary, but was unable to convince publishers the Near Eastern tradition of Biblical debt cancellations was firmly grounded. Two decades ago economic historians and even many Biblical scholars thought the Jubilee Year was merely a literary creation, a utopian escape from practical reality. I encountered a wall of cognitive dissonance at the thought the practice was attested to in increasingly detailed Clean Slate proclamations". David Graeber's book Debt: The First 5,000 Years (2011) drew on Hudson's ideas.

According to the documentary evidence which Hudson and his colleagues assembled and published, rather than debts being held sacred, instead what was sacred in the ancient Near East was the regular cancellation of debts.  These included agrarian debts, freeing of bondservants as well as freedmen from permanent debt servitude, in order to preserve social balance, and to ensure a sturdy agrarian class of freedmen to serve in the army. This was one of the primary goals of Hammurabi's famous law code (c. 1729-1686 b.c.). Such debt amnesties were not destabilizing. They were essential to preserving long-term social and economic stability.

Domestic debts and debt deflation of economy 
From the beginning of the 2000s, Hudson pays special attention to the issues of inflating fictitious capital, which entails the withdrawal of funds from the real economy and leads to debt deflation. He states finance and "financialization" has been key to guiding politics into reducing the productive capacity of the United States and Europe. The elite financial class benefits from non-productive finance tactics and strategies.  They have used these techniques to harm Chile, Russia, Latvia and Hungary.

Hudson states parasitic non-productive, rent-seeking finance looks at industry and labor to determine how much wealth it can extract by fees, interest and tax breaks.  Rather than invest capital into increasing production and efficiency where the market demands it, wealth accumulated is made into loans, at compound interest. In this way, a nation's debt can grow faster than its real goods production.

Compounding interest naturally results in increasing the size of debt which eventually demand more wealth be extracted than production and labor are able to pay.

Rather than extracting taxes from the rentiers to reduce the cost of labor and assets and use the tax revenue to improve infrastructure to increase production efficiency, he states the United States tax system, bank bailouts and quantitative easing sacrifice labor and industry for the benefit of the finance sector. According to Hudson, bankers and rentiers as early as 1880s started to search ways to rationalize untaxing and deregulating finance, real estate and monopolies. They succeed in the 1980s with establishing a neoliberal Washington consensus that states "everyone is worth what they get" so there is no "unearned increment" to be untaxed.

Hudson stresses world success of neoliberal Dollar Diplomacy and financialization is closely connected with its educational support in all big universities. He cites the story of Chile.  One of the first acts of the Chicago Boys in Chile after the military junta overthrew the Allende government in 1973 was to close down every economics department in the nation outside of the Catholic University, a University of Chicago monetarist stronghold. The junta then closed down every social science department and fired, exiled or murdered critics of its ideology in the terrorist Project Condor program waged throughout Latin America and spread to political assassination in the United States itself. What the Chicago Boys recognized is that free market ideology requires totalitarian control of the school and university system, totalitarian control of the press and control of the police where intellectual resistance survives against the idea that economic planning should become much more centralized, but moved out of the hands of government into those of the bankers and other financial institutions, stating: "Free market ideology ends up as political Doublethink in countering any freedom of thought. Its remarkable success in the United States and elsewhere thus has been achieved largely by excluding the history of classical, conservative economic thought from the early 1800s, which culminated in many ways with Marx.  These have been expunged from conventional economics curriculum".  Modern Monetary Theory of which Hudson is an adherent, is gaining traction by showing the falseness of the neoliberal conceiving of economics as purely mathematics.

Position on Karl Marx and Marxian economics 
Hudson identifies himself as a Marxist economist, but his interpretation of Karl Marx is different from most other Marxists. Whilst other Marxists emphasize the contradiction of wage labor and capital as the core issue of today's capitalist world, Hudson rejects this idea.  He believes the core issue of today's failing economies is parasitic forms of finance changing "free market" from its original 1800s definition as "free from non-productive rents;" and, re-defining "free market" to mean the lowering of all regulation and taxation to permit asset stripping both domestically and foreign.

Hudson sides with those who understand Marx as wishing to eliminate all forms of feudalistic rent seeking. If encouraged, these can only lead to a new feudalism and economic serfdom for the 99%.  The original meaning of a free market as discussed by classical political economists was a market free from all forms of rent. The gist of classical political economy was to distinguish earned-productive from unearned-non-productive economic activity.

Hudson also argues Marx was too optimistic.  History did not go in the direction of Capitalism evolving into Socialism—at least not yet.  Since the 1930s today's modern capitalism is dominated by non-productive rentier classes. In classical economics, which includes Marx,  the proletariat as a class is better off paying as few rents as possible. This is because wages can be lower if workers have less overhead.  This lowers the price of goods they produce lower, making them more competitive on the international market.  This is also the logic of making healthcare a public commons run not-for-profit by the government.  This enables wages to be lower for workers.

Hudson contrasts such down-to-earth economic thinking with neoliberal financialists who counter, "Look at the rise in the value of your house! You're making a killing on your house investment!" (paraphrase).

Non-productive rents, tactics and strategies are making all countries, the US included, less self-sufficient. This connects back with the idea of a debt jubilee; and, with taxing non-productive activity, not workers and manufacturing.

The cost of doing nothing is high. Left to run wild, the ever-growing need for debt and rents causes history to regress back to a neo-feudal system; where, your employer pays for your healthcare, provides you your housing and keeps workers in debt permanently.

Although Hudson's views are unpopular amongst other Marxists and sometimes vehemently rejected by them, he points out most Marxists never go beyond Capital, Volume I where Marx does not mention rents at all. This is because a broad consensus existed at the time of Marx among contemporary economists about the toxicity of non-productive rents.  So he did not address the issue of rents until Volume III. 
 
...assumes there is a rent-free market where all commodities are sold at their values. That is how Marx deduces the exploitative nature of capitalism and labour-capital dichotomy as its underlying contradiction.  However, in Capital, Volume II and Capital, Volume III he relaxes his assumptions and discovers other contradictions much closer to what can be observed in today's economic system.

In Capital, Volume III, Marx discusses the tendency of productivity and supply to increase at a faster pace than the consumption power and demand. Marx also revised his earlier ideas as he studied and learned more about the asymmetric development of capitalism. This ultimately led him to soften his revolutionary tone as he realized how dominance of industrially advanced nations over underdeveloped nations blocks revolutionary tendencies among the working classes of dominating nations.

On the other side, Marx clashed with Karl Schapper, suggesting the idea of workers taking over the state power ends up in disaster because too many lack what we call today a college education;

Works

Books 
Hudson is the author of several books, among them the following:
 Super Imperialism: The Economic Strategy of American Empire (1972) 
 Global Fracture: The New International Economic order (1973), a sequel to Super Imperialism.
 Trade, Development and Foreign Debt, Volume I, International Trade: A History of Theories of Polarisation and Convergence in the International Economy (1992).
 Trade, Development and Foreign Debt, Volume II, International Finance: A History of Theories of Polarisation and Convergence in the International Economy (1992).
 A philosophy for a fair society (Georgist Paradigm Series) (1994).
 Urbanization and Land Ownership in the Ancient Near East (1999), edited by Hudson and Baruch A. Levine, with an introduction by Hudson, Volume II in a series sponsored by the Institute for the Study of Long-term Economic Trends and the International Scholars Conference on Ancient Near East Economies: A Colloquium Held at New York University, November 1996 and The Oriental Institute, St. Petersburg, Russia, May 1997, published by Peabody Museum of Archaeology and Ethnology.
 Super Imperialism Walter E. Williams New Edition: The Origin and Fundamentals of U.S. World Dominance (2003),
 Global Fracture: The New International Economic order, Second Edition, 
 America's Protectionist Takeoff, 1815-1914: The Neglected American School of Political Economy (2010), enlarged, revised and updated version of Economics and Technology in 19th-Century American Thought - The Neglected American Economists.
 The Bubble and Beyond (2012)
 Killing the Host (2015) 
 J is For Junk Economics: A Guide to Reality in an Age of Deception (2017) 
 ...and Forgive Them Their Debts: Lending, Foreclosure and Redemption from Bronze Age Finance to the Jubilee Year (2018)
 The Destiny of Civilization: Finance Capitalism, Industrial Capitalism or Socialism (2022)

Documentaries 
Hudson has appeared in several documentaries, including the following:
 The Spider's Web: Britain's Second Empire (2017), by Michael Oswald
 Capitalism (2015), by Ilan Ziv
 Real Estate 4 Ransom (2012), by Grant Kot
 Four Horsemen (2012), by Ross Ashcroft
 Surviving Progress (2011), by Mathieu Roy and Harold Crooks
 The Secret of Oz: Solutions for a broken Economy (2009), by William Still
 Plunder: The Crime of Our Time (2009)
 In Debt We Trust (2006)

See also 
 Post-Keynesian economics

References

External links 

 "Michael Hudson", "Bibliography" and "About". Official website.

1939 births
21st-century American economists
Living people
American economics writers
American male non-fiction writers
Bard College faculty
Classical economists
Economic historians
Economists from Illinois
Georgist economists
Hudson Institute
International finance economists
Macroeconomists
Marxian economists
New York University alumni
Ojibwe people
People from Chicago
Post-Keynesian economists
The New School faculty
University of Chicago alumni
University of Missouri–Kansas City faculty
Writers about globalization